Jahirul Islam is a Jatiya Party (Ershad) politician and the former Member of Parliament of Cox's Bazar-2. He was an officer in the Bangladesh Air Force.

Career
Islam was the Wing Commander of the Bangladesh Air Force. He was elected to parliament from Cox's Bazar-2 as a Jatiya Party candidate in 1986 and 1988.

References

Jatiya Party politicians
Living people
3rd Jatiya Sangsad members
4th Jatiya Sangsad members
Bangladesh Air Force personnel
Year of birth missing (living people)